Bělotín is a municipality and village in Přerov District in the Olomouc Region of the Czech Republic. It has about 1,800 inhabitants.

Administrative parts
Villages of Kunčice, Lučice and Nejdek are administrative parts of Bělotín.

Geography
It lies in the Moravian Gate lowland.

History
The first written mention of Bělotín is from 1201. The village was founded in the second half of the 12th century. Until the German colonization in the 14th century, the population was purely Slavic.

Until the turn of the 14th and 15th centuries, Bělotín was owned by the Hradisko Monastery as a part of the Hranice estate. In 1475, the estate was acquired by the Pernštejn family, then it was sold to the Haugvic of Biskupice family in 1548. After it changed its owners several times, the estate was confiscated after the Battle of White Mountain and donated to Franz von Dietrichstein. His house held Bělotín and the whole Hranice estate until 1858.

During World War II, Bělotín was incorporated by Nazi Germany to Reichsgau Sudetenland, and it was the base for a detached Work Camp E540 (Arbeitskommando E540) for British and Commonwealth prisoners of war, under the administration of the Stalag VIII-B/344 prisoner-of-war camp at Łambinowice. In January 1945, as the Soviet armies resumed their offensive and advanced from the east, the prisoners of the whole Stalag VIII-B/344 POW camp were marched westward in the Long March.

Transport
Bělotín lies on a railway line of local importance Hranice–Studénka.

The D1 motorway and its branch D48 motorway run through the municipality.

Sights
The landmark of Bělotín is the Church of Saint George. This Baroque church dates from 1754 and has a Renaissance tower. The second cultural monument in the municipality is the cemetery Church of Saint Urban in Nejdek from 1752.

Twin towns – sister cities

Bělotín is twinned with:
 Hinterschmiding, Germany
 Höchst im Odenwald, Germany
 Kolonowskie, Poland

References

External links

Villages in Přerov District